Herbert Gintis (February 11, 1940 – January 5, 2023) was an American economist, behavioral scientist, and educator known for his theoretical contributions to sociobiology, especially altruism, cooperation, epistemic game theory, gene-culture coevolution, efficiency wages, strong reciprocity, and human capital theory. Throughout his career, he worked extensively with economist Samuel Bowles. Their landmark book, Schooling in Capitalist America, had multiple editions in five languages since it was first published in 1976. Their book, A Cooperative Species: Human Reciprocity and its Evolution was published by Princeton University Press in 2011.

Life and career
Gintis was born in Philadelphia, Pennsylvania, where his father had a retail furniture business. He grew up there and later in Bala Cynwyd (just outside Philadelphia).  Gintis completed his undergraduate degree at the University of Pennsylvania in three years, one of which was spent at the University of Paris, and received  his B.A. in mathematics in 1961. He then enrolled at Harvard University for post-graduate work in mathematics. After receiving his M.A. in 1962, he grew disillusioned with the subject area, and although still registered at Harvard, became a sandal maker with a shop in Harvard Square. During that time, he became very active in the student movements of the 1960s, including the Students for a Democratic Society and grew increasingly interested in Marxism and economics. In 1963, he switched his PhD program at Harvard from mathematics to economics, completing his PhD in 1969 with his dissertation, Alienation and power: towards a radical welfare economics. He was subsequently hired as an assistant professor in the Harvard Graduate School of Education and then as an assistant professor and later associate professor in Harvard's Economics Department.

Towards the end of his postgraduate studies in economics, Gintis had come into contact with the economist Samuel Bowles who had returned to Harvard after research work in Nigeria. It was to be the beginning of a collaboration that has lasted throughout their careers. In 1968 Gintis and Bowles were part of a group of graduate students and young faculty members at Harvard that included Michael Reich, Richard Edwards, Stephen Marglin, and Patricia Quick. The group held seminars to develop their ideas on a new economics that would encompass issues of alienation of labor, racism, sexism, and imperialism. Many of their ideas were tried out in a Harvard class which they collectively taught, "The Capitalist Economy: Conflict and Power". They also became founding members of the Union of Radical Political Economists.

In 1974 Gintis, along with Bowles, Stephen Resnick, Richard D. Wolff and Richard Edwards, was hired by the Economics Department at the University of Massachusetts Amherst as part of the "radical package" of economists. Bowles and Gintis published their landmark book, Schooling in Capitalist America, in 1976. Their second joint book, Democracy and Capitalism, published a decade later, was a critique of both liberalism and orthodox Marxism and outlined their vision of "postliberal democracy". Their most recent book, A Cooperative Species, was published in 2011. Like Gintis's 2009 The Bounds of Reason, the book reflects his increasing emphasis since the 1990s on the unification of economic theory with sociobiology and other behavioral sciences.

Gintis retired from the University of Massachusetts Amherst as professor emeritus in 2003. In 2014, he was a visiting professor in the Economics Department of Central European University where he taught since 2005, visiting professor at the University of Siena, a position he held since 1989, and an external professor at the Santa Fe Institute where he taught since 2001.

Gintis was a prolific book reviewer, having published over 500 book reviews on Amazon.

Gintis died on January 5, 2023, at the age of 82.

Books
In addition to numerous scholarly articles and book chapters, Gintis has authored or co-authored the following books:

 
 
Also as: 
 
 
 
 
 

From 1997 to 2006 Gintis and anthropologist Robert Boyd  co-chaired "Economic Environments and the Evolution of Norms and Preferences", a multidisciplinary research project funded by the MacArthur Foundation. Much of the research stemming from the project has been published in two books co-edited by Gintis and other project members:

References

External links
 
Profile on Google Scholar
Video: Herbert Gintis on evolution and morality delivered at Cambridge University, 9 July 2009 (official YouTube channel of Cambridge University).

1940 births
2023 deaths
Behavioral economists
Game theorists
Harvard Graduate School of Arts and Sciences alumni
Scientists from Philadelphia
Academic staff of Central European University
University of Massachusetts Amherst faculty
New York University faculty
Neuroeconomists
Santa Fe Institute people
Economists from Pennsylvania
21st-century American economists
People from Bala Cynwyd, Pennsylvania